Nicholas Trainor (born 29 June 1975) is a former English cricketer. He played for Gloucestershire between 1996 and 1998.

References

External links

1975 births
Living people
Cricketers from Gateshead
English cricketers
Gauteng cricketers
Gloucestershire cricketers
Northumberland cricketers